Sylla Sow (born 8 August 1996) is a Dutch professional footballer. He plays for Eredivisie club Go Ahead Eagles.

Club career
Sow made his professional debut in the Eerste Divisie for Jong FC Utrecht on 5 August 2016 in a game against NAC Breda.

On 29 April 2018, Sow made his debut in the Eredivisie for FC Utrecht in a match against Heracles Almelo, which ended in a 2–2 draw. He came on as a substitute in the 81st minute for Urby Emanuelson, but was unable to score. Thereby, he became the third player from the youth academy to have made his debut in the Eredivisie after having played for Jong FC Utrecht in the second-tier Eerste Divisie. Nick Venema and Odysseus Velanas preceded him.

On 2 January 2019, it was announced that Sow had signed with RKC Waalwijk. He left the club as his contract expired in June 2021.

On 10 August 2021, he moved to England and joined EFL League One club Sheffield Wednesday. He would make his debut in an EFL Trophy match against Newcastle United U21, where he would open the scoring in a 3-0 win.

On 27 August 2022, it was reported that Sow returned to the Netherlands, joining Eerste Divisie club De Graafschap for an undisclosed fee. However, the transfer fell through, and on 29 August 2022 Sow signed a two-year contract with Go Ahead Eagles in Eredivisie instead.

Personal life
Born in the Netherlands, Sow is of Senegalese descent.

Career statistics

References

External links
 

1996 births
Living people
Dutch footballers
Dutch people of Senegalese descent
Quick 1888 players
NEC Nijmegen players
Jong FC Utrecht players
FC Utrecht players
RKC Waalwijk players
Sheffield Wednesday F.C. players
Go Ahead Eagles players
Eredivisie players
Eerste Divisie players
English Football League players
Association football forwards
Footballers from Nijmegen
Dutch expatriate sportspeople in England
Dutch expatriate footballers
Expatriate footballers in England